The Battle of Dornock was fought on 25 March 1333 during the Second War of Scottish Independence.

Background
In 1333 Edward Balliol, a claimant to the Scottish throne, sought support from the English King Edward III. In exchange for ceding the region of Lothian to England, Balliol was given assistance and replenished forces. He returned to Scotland and attacked the Scottish at Berwick-upon-Tweed. After several retaliatory and counterattacks from both sides, the attempt failed and no tactical advantage was gained.

Build Up
In response, William of Lochmaben, Sir Ralph Dacre and Sir Anthony Lucy led an English force of 800 men into Dumfriesshire. William Douglas, Lord of Liddesdale and 50 Scottish defenders along with Sir Humphrey Boys and Sir Humphrey Jardine moved to intercept them.

The battle
On 25 March 1333, the small Scottish force intercepted the English at the village of Dornock. Little is known about the battle itself, as it was reportedly over very quickly, but 24 Scots (along with the two Humphreys) were killed and Douglas was taken prisoner. England reported only two losses.

Aftermath
The rest of the Scots fled, and Douglas was imprisoned for two years under special instructions from King Edward. The Scottish poet Andrew Wyntoun noted the battle in his verse:

A well in the area was known as the sword well by the late 18th century, probably because artefacts of the battle were discovered near to there.

References

Sources

Primary
 Knighton, Henry, Chronicon, ed. Joseph Rawson Lumby, 1889–1895.
 The Lanercost Chronicle, ed. and trans H. Maxwell, 1913.
 Wyntoun, Andrew of, The Original Chronicle of Scotland, ed. F. J. Amours, 1907.

Secondary
 Neilson, G., The Battle of Dornock, in Transactions of the Dumfriesshire and Galloway Antiquarian and Natural History Society, 1895–6.
 Nicholson, R., Edward III and the Scots, 1965.

1333 in Scotland
Dornock 1333
Conflicts in 1333